The 18th Quebec Cinema Awards ceremony were held on March 20, 2016 to honour films made with the participation of the Quebec film industry in 2015.

The ceremony was the first to be held since Québec Cinéma dropped the "Jutra Awards" name from its awards program, following the publication in February 2016 of allegations that namesake director Claude Jutra had been a pedophile. The organization established a committee to determine a new permanent name for the awards, which announced the new Prix Iris name in October 2016.

Winners at the 2016 ceremony received a new wooden statue, replacing the previous trophy created by Charles Daudelin. The new trophy was created by Montreal's Nouveau Studio; it is made of solid maple, painted white, with gold and acrylic leaves. With only three weeks to design and produce the new statue following the renaming of the award, it would not have been possible to cast the trophies out of bronze.

The Passion of Augustine won in six categories including Best Picture and Best Director (Léa Pool). Other multiple winners were My Internship in Canada with three, and Felix and Meira, Snowtime!, and Brooklyn, with two each.

Winners and nominees

References

External links

2016 in Quebec
Quebec
18
2015 in Canadian cinema